Vågåvatn or Vågåvatnet is a lake located in Lom and Vågå municipalities in Innlandet county, Norway. The lake is part of the river Otta, which begins in Skjåk municipality, flows into lake Vågåvatn. It then exits the Vågåvatn at Vågåmo and continues its journey through the Ottadalen valley before leaving Vågå municipality to meet the Gudbrandsdalslågen river at the town of Otta in Sel municipality.

The lake is one of the 200 largest lakes in Norway.

See also
List of lakes in Norway

References

Vågå
Lom, Norway
Lakes of Innlandet